Gmina Biskupiec may refer to either of the following administrative districts in Warmian-Masurian Voivodeship, Poland:
Gmina Biskupiec, Nowe Miasto County
Gmina Biskupiec, Olsztyn County